Halolaelaps areolatus is a species of mite in the family Halolaelapidae.

References

Mesostigmata
Articles created by Qbugbot
Animals described in 1946